Howard University Press (HUP) was a publisher that was part of Howard University, founded in 1972. HUP was the first black university press in the US, with its first chief executive being Charles F. Harris, who published about 100 titles under the imprint, before going on to found Amistad Press in 1986. Books published by HUP included A Poetic Equation: Conversations Between Nikki Giovanni and Margaret Walker (1974), The Wayward and the Seeking: A Collection of Writing by Jean Toomer (1980); and the American edition of How Europe Underdeveloped Africa (1974). The press closed in 2011, and a majority of its titles were to be acquired by Black Classic Press (BCP).

In October 2011, Black Classic Press announced that despite HUP announcing the transfer of its titles and contracts to Black Classic Press in May 2011, the agreement was cancelled by Black Classic Press in October due to a lack of communication from Howard University representatives and their failure to return a signed agreement to BCP.

See also

 List of English-language book publishing companies
 List of university presses
 African-American book publishers in the United States, 1960–80

References

External links

American companies disestablished in 2011
Howard University
Publishing companies established in 1972
University presses of the United States